Francisco "Paking" Garcia Rabat (June 19, 1934  – July 19, 2008) was a Filipino politician and basketball player.

Basketball career
Rabat was also a member of the Philippine national basketball team and was part of the squad that won the bronze medal at the 1954 FIBA World Championship He was given the monicker, "Rajah of Rebound". At 18 years old, Rabat was also the youngest player in the squad. In college basketball, he played for the Ateneo Blue Eagles.

Political career
Rabat served as Governor of Davao Oriental from 1978 to 1986. As governor, he oversaw the project for the Mati Airport. He also served as the mayor of Mati. With Joel Mayo Almario, whose family is a political rival of the Rabats, Rabat successfully lobbied for the cityhood of Mati. Mati, a former municipality, became a component city on June 19, 2008 after a plebiscite held the day before. He sought re-election in 2007 local elections but withdrew his bid after he was diagnosed with cancer. His daughter Michelle campaigned in his stead and was elected as Mati mayor.

Death
Rabat died on July 19, 2008 while confined at the Davao Doctors Hospital due to cancer.

Personal life
He was married with Edith Nakpil, a former beauty queen who competed in the Miss Philippines pageant. Rabat had four sons and a daughter with Nakpil.

References

1934 births
2008 deaths
Governors of Davao Oriental
Filipino sportsperson-politicians
Philippines men's national basketball team players
Filipino men's basketball players
Ateneo Blue Eagles men's basketball players
Basketball players at the 1954 Asian Games
Medalists at the 1954 Asian Games
Asian Games gold medalists for the Philippines
21st-century Filipino politicians
1954 FIBA World Championship players